Philocrates (Greek: Φιλοκράτης; floruit: 340s BC) was an ancient Greek politician from Athens who first negotiated the Peace of Philocrates with Philip II of Macedonia after Philip devastated the city of Olynthos in 348 BC. The unpopularity of the treaty resulted in Philocrates being prosecuted in 343 BC by Hyperides for corruption (i.e. accepting bribes and favors from Philip II). Philocrates ultimately fled into exile and was condemned to death during his absence.

References

Citations

Sources

Ancient Greek statesmen
4th-century BC Athenians